The 1998 Budweiser/G.I. Joe's 200 was the ninth round of the 1998 CART FedEx Champ Car World Series season, held on June 21, 1998, on the Portland International Raceway in Portland, Oregon. Alex Zanardi was the winner of the race, his second consecutive win and his fourth of the season and extended his points lead to 37 points.

Classification

Race

Caution flags

Lap Leaders

Point standings after race

Grand Prix of Portland
Budweiser